This list of tallest buildings in Knoxville ranks skyscrapers and other structures by height in the U.S. city of Knoxville, Tennessee. The tallest building in Knoxville is the First Tennessee Plaza (Plaza Tower), at 27 stories, followed by the adjacent Riverview Tower, at 24 stories. The Tower at Morgan Hill (formerly the Kingston Apartments) is the third highest at 21 stories.

Tallest buildings
This list ranks the top-ten tallest buildings in Knoxville, based on standard height measurement. This includes spires and architectural details but does not include antenna masts. The "Year" column indicates the year in which a building was completed.

Tallest proposed
This is a partial list of skyscrapers and high-rises that have been planned in Knoxville at over 15 stories, but which projects have been canceled.

References

Knoxville
 Tallest
Tallest in Knoxville